John Leslie Messenger (14 May 1902 – 24 May 1982) was a British philatelist who signed the Roll of Distinguished Philatelists in 1979.

References

British philatelists
Signatories to the Roll of Distinguished Philatelists
1902 births
1982 deaths